Pliješevina is a small village in the municipality of Pljevlja, Montenegro.

Demographics
According to the 2003 census, the village had a population of 76. According to the 2011 census, its population was 48, 43 of whom were Serbs.

References

Populated places in Pljevlja Municipality